Empire Cinemas Limited is a multiplex cinema chain in the UK. There are 14 Empire Cinemas across the country, with 131 screens in total.

Ownership and management
The ultimate beneficial owner of Empire Cinemas Ltd is Irish entrepreneur Thomas Anderson. Anderson also owns Inspiration Holdings Ltd, a company which now owns Altive Media, Pearl & Dean advertising company, Titan Parking and Clarkebond. The CEO of Empire Cinemas, Nolly, is also an Executive Director of Inspiration Holdings.

History

Empire was originally a cinema in Leicester Square in London which opened in 1884 as the Empire Theatre and was a West End variety theatre, designed by Thomas Verity.

Empire Cinemas Limited was formed in 2005 when Empire acquired the cinemas divested from Odeon Cinemas and Cineworld after the Office of Fair Trading had required them to divest 11 of the Odeon chain and six of the Cineworld chain. In 2005, both Odeon and the UK operations of UCI were taken over by Terra Firma who planned to merge the businesses under the Odeon brand. At the same time, Cineworld took over the UK and Ireland operations of UGC and began merging them into their existing Cineworld brand. Empire Cinemas Ltd acquired both groups of available cinemas and began to rebrand them all as Empire Cinemas.

In July 2016, the company sold five cinemas, including the flagship in Leicester Square, to Cineworld cinemas  for £94 million. The cinemas transferred to Cineworld cinemas on 12 August 2016. In June 2017 the Newcastle upon Tyne cinema was also sold to Cineworld cinemas 

In March 2020, Empire Cinemas and all other cinemas in the UK closed temporarily due to a national lockdown in response to the ongoing COVID-19 pandemic.

Magazine
Empire, in conjunction with cinema chain Showcase, publishes Escape, a bi-monthly customer magazine, distributed free at 50 cinemas. It contains film reviews, interviews and competitions.

Current locations

Ealing site controversy

Empire Cinemas closed its Ealing cinema on 5 September 2008 and demolished the cinema in early 2009 for redevelopment, retaining the front facade. Empire had not yet started building work on the new cinema or (according to Ealing Council) presented a timescale for the building work as of 25 July 2011, so Ealing Council started to pursue a compulsory purchase of the Ealing cinema site. At a council meeting attended by CEO Justin Ribbons on 28 June 2011, Mr Ribbons responded to the council's complaints, saying that the delay was caused by a misunderstanding between Empire and council planning officers. At a later meeting between Justin Ribbons and Ealing Council on 14 September 2011, Mr Ribbons said that he was "optimistic that work could re-start before Christmas" however as of May 2012, construction work on the site had not yet started.

On 29 May 2012, Ealing Council's leader wrote to Empire to inform them that compulsory purchase proceedings would now start. On 2 June 2012, Empire Cinemas released a statement to the press, announcing that Clarkebond (a consultancy owned by Empire's parent company, Inspiration Holdings) had been appointed to manage the construction, which would now start in "August 2012"; and that the finished cinema would open in "early 2014". As of 3 October 2012, construction had still not started and Empire changed the start date listed on their website from "August" to "August/September". As of 18 October 2012, any reference to a start date has been removed from the web site. On 19 October 2012, construction and excavation vehicles were seen in operation on the cinema site, however as of July 2015 no further building work had commenced.

Ealing Council served a compulsory purchase order on the site in July 2014, as part of plans to create a new "cultural quarter" in the area. The council announced it had reached an agreement with Land Securities to develop the cinema and buildings nearby, and that Picturehouse Cinemas would operate the new cinema. An inquiry into the compulsory purchase order was launched in April 2015, and was approved in October 2015. Construction work began on the site in December 2016.

References

External links

 

Cinema chains in the United Kingdom